Comden is a surname. Notable people with the surname include:

Betty Comden (1917–2006), one-half of the musical-comedy duo Comden and Green
Danny Comden (born 1969), American actor, film director, producer, and writer

See also
Camden (surname)